Clubul Sportiv Gloria Albești, commonly known as Gloria Albești, is Romanian football club based in Albești, Constanța County and currently playing in the Liga III, the third tier of the Romanian football league system.

History
Gloria Albești was founded in 1974 and initially played in the Mangalia City Championship. In the next forty-six years, the club played constantly at the Constanța County Championship level.

Gloria earn the promotion to Third Division at the end of the 2019–20 season, when was declared the county champion and the representative of Constanța County at the promotion play-off to Liga III being the only team from the top four that complied with the conditions imposed by the medical protocol after the season was suspended in March 2020 because of the COVID-19 pandemic in Romania. Due to the fact that the winner of Liga IV – Tulcea County, Pescărușul Sarichioi, did not participate in the play-off, Gloria Albești and CSM Râmnicu Sărat, the winner of Liga IV – Buzău County, played a decisive match 0–0  at Oțelul Stadium in Galați. The team led by Ionel Melenco was composed among others: David Gârniță, Rareș Micu – Răzvan Arteni, Ilie Ionuț (cpt.), Adelin Cristea, Alexandru Boț, Cornel Ciobanu, Adrian Moga, Ciprian Loloț, Mihai Zugravu, Vasile Șicu, Marian Canțur, Valentin Găiceanu, Daniel Simion, Tănase Halep and Marius Busuioc.

The 2020–21 season saw the debut of Gloria in Liga III. Ionel Melenco was sacked after the first part of the season, being replaced with Vasile Enache, who led the team to finish the season on eighth place.

In the following season, the team of the small commune from the South-East of Romania, after missing the qualification in the play-off in the last round finished first in the play-out, fifth in the general ranking of the Series II.

Honours
Liga IV – Constanța County
Winners (1): 2019–20

Players

First-team squad

Out on loan

Club officials

Board of directors

Current technical staff

League history

References

External links

Association football clubs established in 1974
Football clubs in Constanța County
Liga III clubs
Liga IV clubs
1974 establishments in Romania